Dorival Thomas Júnior (born 6 April 1976 in Terra Roxa) is a Brazilian footballer. He plays for Estoril.

External links
2004–05, Portuguese Liga 2006–07, 2007–08 

1976 births
Living people
Brazilian footballers
Brazilian expatriate footballers
Expatriate footballers in Portugal
G.D. Estoril Praia players
C.F. União players
Expatriate footballers in France
Stade Lavallois players
Ligue 2 players
Primeira Liga players
Association football defenders
Brazilian expatriate sportspeople in China
Footballers from São Paulo (state)
Expatriate footballers in China
Brazilian expatriate sportspeople in France